The 1926–27 Scottish Division One season was won by Rangers by five points over nearest rival Motherwell. Dundee United and Morton finished 19th and 20th respectively and were relegated to the 1927–28 Scottish Division Two.

League table

Results

References

Scottish Football Archive

1926–27 Scottish Football League
Scottish Division One seasons
Scot